Bilha is one of the 90 Legislative Assembly constituencies of Chhattisgarh state in India. It is in Bilaspur district.

Members of Legislative Assembly

Election results

2018

See also
List of constituencies of the Chhattisgarh Legislative Assembly
Bilaspur district, Chhattisgarh
 Bilha

References

Bilaspur district, Chhattisgarh
Assembly constituencies of Chhattisgarh